Robert Vivian Storer (1900–1958), Australian venereologist, sex educator, and writer, was born in Adelaide in 1900.
Educated at the University of Adelaide, he left Australia in 1921 and graduated from St Bartholomew's Hospital, London, as a general practitioner in 1923. He then undertook postgraduate study in venereal disease in Vienna for two years.

He returned to Adelaide in 1925 and set up a venereal disease practice there. Two years later he married and moved to Sydney. In the mid-1930s he practiced in London before settling permanently in Melbourne in 1939.

Storer was active in sex education and family planning circles in Australia in the late 1920s and early 1930s, and was a founding consultant of the Australian Family Planning Association when it was formed in 1928. He later left the Association following disagreements with them over the best means of educating people about sexuality and contraception. Storer wrote a number of sex education books in the 1920s and '30s, which were notable for their accepting attitude to human sexuality, including homosexuality and bisexuality. Storer's sexual encounters with men were the subject of tabloid newspaper stories and court actions.

Storer was deregistered by the General Medical Council in 1936 for "infamous professional conduct" (advertising his practice in the daily press).  He returned to Australia and started a consulting pharmaceutical company in Melbourne, where he died in 1958.

References

1900 births
1958 deaths
Alumni of Barts and The London School of Medicine and Dentistry
Australian LGBT writers
20th-century Australian LGBT people